Jane Sperry Connell (pronounced con-NELL, née Bennett; October 27, 1925 – September 22, 2013) was an American actress and singer.

Early years 
Connell was born in Berkeley, California, to Louis Wesley and Mary (née Sperry) Bennett. She majored in drama at the University of California, where she met her future husband.

Career
Connell began her career with her husband Gordon, entertaining in San Francisco night clubs such as The Purple Onion and The Hungry I. Eventually the couple moved to New York City, where Connell made her Off-Broadway debut in the 1955 revival of The Threepenny Opera, a long-running hit at the Theatre de Lys. In the London production of Once Upon a Mattress, Connell starred as Winifred, the role that Carol Burnett had originated in New York. Her Broadway debut came in the role of Mrs. Peachum in Threepenny Opera (1955).

Connell's most prominent success came in 1966 when she was cast as Agnes Gooch in the original Broadway production of Jerry Herman's Mame. She recreated the role in the 1974 screen adaptation after Lucille Ball, the film's star, became dissatisfied with Madeline Kahn, who originally had been signed to play Gooch.

Only four-foot-eleven, Connell was described as a master of the large comic gesture in The Oxford Companion to American Theatre, which described her as "a tiny woman with a giant, squeaking voice".

Connell was nominated for the Tony Award for Best Featured Actress in a Musical for her performance in Me and My Girl (1986). Additional Broadway credits include New Faces of 1956 (1956); Drat! The Cat! (1965); Dear World (1969), once again supporting Angela Lansbury; the short-lived 1983 revival of Mame, in which Lansbury reprised her 1966 lead role; Lend Me a Tenor (1989); Crazy for You (1992); and Moon Over Buffalo (1995), starring Carol Burnett; The Full Monty (2000), succeeding Kathleen Freeman, who died during her run in show, and The Adventures of Tom Sawyer (2001).

Jane and Gordon Connell enjoyed extensive theatre careers. They appeared together on Broadway in Lysistrata (November 1972), starring Melina Mercouri in the title role. She appeared in New York City Center Encores! production of Call Me Madam (February 1995), and the Weill Recital Hall of Carnegie Hall concert presentation of Noël Coward's Sail Away (November 1999).

Jane Connell's film roles included Ladybug Ladybug (1963), Kotch (1971), Won Ton Ton, the Dog Who Saved Hollywood (1976), House Calls (1978), Rabbit Test (1978), and Dr. Jekyll and Ms. Hyde (1995). Her decades of television work included six appearances on Bewitched, where she variously played Mother Goose, Martha Washington, Queen Hepzibah and, in a memorable turn as Queen Victoria, often uttered the phrase "We are not amused." She also appeared on Green Acres, All in the Family, Love, American Style, M*A*S*H, Maude, Good Times, Law & Order and many more. 

Connell portrayed Jane in the comedy series Stanley (1956). She was a regular on the children's series Mr. Mayor (1964) and the situation comedy The Dumplings. From 1991 to 1994, she had the recurring role of social worker Roberta Domedian on the sitcom Big Brother Jake.

Family
She married Gordon Connell, an actor and musician, in 1948. They remained married until her death in 2013. The couple had two daughters.

Death
Jane Connell died on September 22, 2013, aged 87, at the Lillian Booth Actors Home of the Actors Fund in Englewood, New Jersey from undisclosed causes. She was survived by her husband (who died in 2016) and two daughters, Melissa and Maggie.

References

External links
 Profile, IBDB.com
 
 
Jane and Gordon Connell papers, 1923-2015, held by the Billy Rose Theatre Division, New York Public Library for the Performing Arts.

1925 births
2013 deaths
Actresses from California
American women singers
American musical theatre actresses
American stage actresses
American film actresses
American television actresses
Actresses from Berkeley, California
20th-century American actresses
21st-century American actresses
University of California alumni